This is a list of lesbian, gay, and bisexual, and transgender (LGBT) people who have served in various institutions of the government of France at the national and sub-national levels.

Cabinet members 
Former

 Jean-Jacques Aillagon (2002-2004)
 Roger Karoutchi (2007-2009)
 Frédéric Mitterrand (2009-2012)
 Mounir Mahjoubi (2018-2019)
 Joël Giraud (2020-2022)

Current

 Clément Beaune
 Gabriel Attal
 Franck Riester
 Olivier Dussopt

Members of Parliament 
Former 
 Charles, marquis de Villette  (1792)
 André Labarrère(fr)
 Laurence Vanceunebrock-Mialon (1017-2022)
 Gabriel Attal (2017-2022)
 Jean-Jacques-Régis de Cambacérès (1792-1795)
 Luc Carvounas (2011-2020)
 Sergio Coronado (2012-2017)
 Bertrand Delanoë (1981-1986)
 Renaud Donnedieu de Vabres  (1997-2007)
 Louis Jacquinot (1945-1973)
 Mounir Mahjoubi (2017-2019)
 Matthieu Orphelin (2017-2022)
 Pacôme Rupin (2017-2022)
Current 

 Ségolène Amiot
 Bruno Bilde
 Sébastien Chenu
 Raphaël Gérard
 Joël Giraud
 Andy Kerbrat
 Maxime Minot
 Franck Riester
 Mélanie Vogel (Senate)
 Roger Karoutchi (Senate)

Members of the European Parliament 
Former
 Steeve Briois (ID)
 Roger Karoutchi (EPP)
 Florian Philippot (ID)
 Michel Teychenné (S&D)
Current

 Stéphane Séjourné (Renew)
 Pierre Karleskind (Renew)

Municipal government

Mayors and deputy mayors
 Mayor of Paris: Bertrand Delanoë – 2001-2014  [Came out: 1998]
 Mayor of Hénin-Beaumont: Steeve Briois - (2014–present)
 Mayor of Alfortville: Luc Carvounas (2012-2017, 2020–present)
 Mayor of Nancy: Mathieu Klein (2020–present)
 Mayor of Coulommiers: Franck Riester (2008-2017)
 First Deputy Mayor of Paris: Bruno Julliard
 Mayor of L'Argentière-la-Bessée: Joël Giraud

Councilmembers
 Member of the Council of Paris: Ian Brossat
 Member of the 17th arrondissement of Paris: Camille Cabral
 Member of the Council of Paris: Caroline Mécary
 Member of the Council of Paris: Alice Coffin

References 

French LGBT politicians
France